The following is a list of notable events and releases of the year 1910 in Norwegian music.

Events

Deaths

 July
 21 – Johan Selmer (76), composer and conductor.

Births

 February
 14 – Leif Juster, comedian, singer and actor (died 1995).

 May
 3 – Sigbjørn Bernhoft Osa, traditional folk fiddler and composer (died 1990).

 June
 3 – Christian Hartmann, composer (died 1985).

 October
 12 – Brita Bratland, traditional folk singer (died 1975).

 November
 14 – Jens Book-Jenssen, singer, songwriter, revue artist, and theatre director. (died 1999).

See also
 1910 in Norway
 Music of Norway

References

 
Norwegian music
Norwegian
Music
1910s in Norwegian music